Prunus cocomilia is a species of plum commonly called Italian plum. It is native to Albania, Croatia, Greece, southern Italy (including Sicily), Montenegro, North Macedonia, Serbia, and western Turkey.

References

External links
 
 Photos of Prunus cocomilia at the University of Trieste from altervista.org

cocomilia
cocomilia
Flora of Albania
Flora of Croatia
Flora of Greece
Flora of Italy
Flora of Sicily
Flora of North Macedonia
Flora of Montenegro
Flora of Turkey
Least concern plants
Taxonomy articles created by Polbot